The 1944 Cincinnati Reds season was a season in American baseball. It consisted of the Cincinnati Reds attempting to win the National League, although finishing in third place. They finished the season with 89 wins and 65 losses.

Offseason 
 Prior to 1944 season (exact date unknown)
Kent Peterson was signed as an amateur free agent by the Reds.
Kermit Wahl was signed as an amateur free agent by the Reds.

Regular season 
On June 10, Joe Nuxhall made his major league debut. At age 15, he is (as of the 2022 season) the youngest confirmed player ever to play Major League Baseball. He pitched just two-thirds of an inning, giving up 5 runs on 2 hits and 5 walks. He would not appear in the majors again until 1952.

Season standings

Record vs. opponents

Roster

Player stats

Batting

Starters by position 
Note: Pos = Position; G = Games played; AB = At bats; H = Hits; Avg. = Batting average; HR = Home runs; RBI = Runs batted in

Other batters 
Note: G = Games played; AB = At bats; H = Hits; Avg. = Batting average; HR = Home runs; RBI = Runs batted in

Pitching

Starting pitchers 
Note: G = Games pitched; IP = Innings pitched; W = Wins; L = Losses; ERA = Earned run average; SO = Strikeouts

Other pitchers 
Note: G = Games pitched; IP = Innings pitched; W = Wins; L = Losses; ERA = Earned run average; SO = Strikeouts

Relief pitchers 
Note: G = Games pitched; W = Wins; L = Losses; SV = Saves; ERA = Earned run average; SO = Strikeouts

Farm system

References

External links
1944 Cincinnati Reds at Baseball-Reference

Cincinnati Reds seasons
Cincinnati Reds season
Cincinnati Reds